Gamalero (Gamaleri in Piedmontese) is a comune (municipality) in the Province of Alessandria in the Italian region Piedmont, located about  southeast of Turin and about  southwest of Alessandria.

Gamalero borders the following municipalities: Carentino, Cassine, Castellazzo Bormida, Castelspina, Frascaro, Mombaruzzo, and Sezzadio.

References

External links
 Official website

Cities and towns in Piedmont